Henry's Chapel is an unincorporated community in Cherokee County, located in the U.S. state of Texas. According to the Handbook of Texas, the community had a population of 75 in 2000. It is located within the Tyler-Jacksonville combined statistical area.

History
The area in what is known as Henry's Chapel today may have been settled by people from Arkansas in the early 1820s and named it for a local church. It had two churches, two stores, and 75 residents in the mid-1930s. One of the stores and both churches closed but it gained another church in the early 1990s. The population remained at 75 from 1990 through 2000.

Geography

Education
Henry's Chapel had its own school in 1897 and had 27 students. Today, the community is served by the Carlisle Independent School District.

Notes

Unincorporated communities in Cherokee County, Texas
Unincorporated communities in Texas